Bölük is a village in the Yüksekova District of Hakkâri Province in Turkey. The village is populated by Kurds of the Dirî tribe and had a population of 867 in 2022.

Population 
Population history of the village from 2000 to 2022:

References 

Kurdish settlements in Hakkâri Province
Villages in Yüksekova District